The Khalsa Jatha is a Sikh place of worship in the Notting Hill area of London. The gurdwara was established in 1908, and affiliated to Chief Khalsa Dewan of Amritsar. From 1913 to 1969 congregations were held at 79 Sinclair Road, Shepherd Bush. The present  building was established in 1969 onwards at Queensdale Road. The building was later refurbished by Peter Virdi Foundation.

References

Gurdwaras in London
20th-century gurdwaras